Sant'Apollonia was a former Benedictine convent, founded in 1339, just north of the center of Florence, in Italy.

Some of the remaining structures are demarcated on three sides by via Ventisette Aprile, via Santa Reparata, and Via San Gallo, located about a block west of Piazza San Marco, just north of the city center. The structures of the convent, suppressed since the 19th-century, are now put to different uses. The small church building is still present on the corner of Via Ventisette Aprile and San Gallo.

Museo di Cenacolo di Sant'Apollonia

The best known component is the former refectory or dining hall of the convent, the Cenacolo of Sant'Apollonia now part of the Museums of the Commune of Florence, with entrance through a nondescript door near the corner of Via Ventisette Aprile and Reparata. The refectory harbors the well-conserved fresco, The Last Supper, by the Italian Renaissance artist Andrea del Castagno, along with the same artist's The Dead Christ Supported by Two Angels, originally above a door in the convent. The small museum also displays other fresco designs and works by Castagno, Neri di Bicci, Paolo Schiavo, and Raffaello da Montelupo.

References

External links

Former churches in Florence
15th-century Roman Catholic church buildings in Italy
1339 establishments in Europe
14th-century establishments in the Republic of Florence
National museums of Italy